Golden Kamuy is a 2018 Japanese anime series, based on the manga series of the same title, written and illustrated by Satoru Noda. The anime was announced in July 2017 in Weekly Young Jump. The series was directed by Hitoshi Nanba and written by Noboru Takagi, with music by Kenichiro Suehiro, art direction by Atsushi Morikawa, and CG direction by Yuuko Okumura and Yasutaka Hamada. Kenichi Ohnuki is adapting the character designs for animation, while Koji Watanabe designs firearms, Shinya Anasuma designs the props, and Ryō Sumiyoshi designs the animals.  Like with the manga, Hiroshi Nakagawa, an Ainu language linguist from Chiba University, works on the anime as an Ainu language supervisor. The series premiered from April 9 to June 25, 2018 on Tokyo MX, ytv, STV, and BS11 and ran for 12 episodes. The series' opening theme is "Winding Road" performed by Man with a Mission while the ending theme is "Hibana" performed by The Sixth Lie.

The series is simulcast on Crunchyroll, and an English dub started streaming on Funimation starting on April 30, 2018. The series will also be released across three DVD and Blu-ray volumes in Japan, starting in July 2018; they had originally been planned to release starting in June, but were delayed one month to allow for improvements to the footage compared to the TV broadcast version. The Japanese home video volumes will include the Golden Dōga Gekijō shorts, including four episodes that are exclusive to the first volume.


Episode list

Notes

References

2018 Japanese television seasons
Golden Kamuy episode lists